The butterfly curve is a transcendental plane curve discovered by Temple H. Fay of University of Southern Mississippi in 1989.  



Equation

The curve is given by the following parametric equations:

or by the following polar equation:

The  term has been added for purely aesthetic reasons, to make the butterfly appear fuller and more pleasing to the eye.

Developments 

In 2006, two mathematicians using Mathematica analyzed the function, and found variants where leaves, flowers or other insects became apparent.

See also
https://books.google.com/books?id=AsYaCgAAQBAJ&lpg=PA732&ots=yBR1l1ltnS&dq=OSCAR%20RAMIREZ%20POLAR%20EQUATION&pg=PA732#v=onepage&q=OSCAR%20RAMIREZ%20POLAR%20EQUATION&f=false
 Butterfly curve (algebraic)
 Oscar’s Butterfly Polar Equation
r = (cos 5θ)2 + sin 3θ + 0.3 for 0 ≤ θ ≤ 6π
(A polar equation discovered by Oscar Ramirez, a UCLA student, in the fall of 1991.)

References

External links

 Butterfly Curve plotted in WolframAlpha

Plane curves